Manchester of the East is a nickname of:
Ahmedabad, Gujarat, India
Faridabad, Haryana, India
Kanpur, Uttar Pradesh, India
Mumbai, India; see redevelopment of Mumbai mills